Eric Michael Runesson, born Andersson (born 26 September 1960), is a Swedish lawyer, member of the Swedish Academy and Justice of the Supreme Court of Sweden.

Biography
Eric M. Runesson became a member of the Swedish Bar Association in 1993. He became a lawyer and partner in Sandart & Partners Law Office in 1996. Runesson became a Doctor of Law at the Stockholm School of Economics in 1996, writing his thesis on the Reconstruction of incomplete contracts. He became a lecturer in 2000.

Runesson was appointed on 14 June 2018 as Justice of the Supreme Court of Sweden, effective 3 September 2018.

On 4 October 2018 Eric Runesson was elected to the Swedish Academy. He formally entered the Academy on 20 December 2018 and succeeded Lotta Lotass on chair 1.

References

 
 

Justices of the Supreme Court of Sweden
1960 births
Living people
20th-century Swedish lawyers
Members of the Swedish Academy
21st-century Swedish judges